In mathematics, and in particular gauge theory and complex geometry, a Hermitian Yang–Mills connection (or Hermite-Einstein connection) is a Chern connection associated to an inner product on a holomorphic vector bundle over a Kähler manifold that satisfies an analogue of Einstein's equations: namely, the contraction of the curvature 2-form of the connection with the Kähler form is required to be a constant times the identity transformation. Hermitian Yang–Mills connections are special examples of Yang–Mills connections, and are often called instantons.

The Kobayashi–Hitchin correspondence proved by Donaldson, Uhlenbeck and Yau asserts that a holomorphic vector bundle over a compact Kähler manifold admits a Hermitian Yang–Mills connection if and only if it is slope polystable.

Hermitian Yang–Mills equations

Hermite-Einstein connections arise as solutions of the Hermitian Yang-Mills equations. These are a system of partial differential equations on a vector bundle over a Kähler manifold, which imply the Yang-Mills equations. Let  be a Hermitian connection on a Hermitian vector bundle  over a Kähler manifold  of dimension . Then the Hermitian Yang-Mills equations are

for some constant . Here we have

Notice that since  is assumed to be a Hermitian connection, the curvature  is skew-Hermitian, and so  implies . 
When the underlying Kähler manifold  is compact,  may be computed using Chern-Weil theory. Namely, we have

where  is the slope of the vector bundle , given by

Due to the similarity of the second condition in the Hermitian Yang-Mills equations with the equations for an Einstein metric, solutions of the Hermitian Yang-Mills equations are often called Hermite-Einstein connections, as well as Hermitian Yang-Mills connections.

Examples

The Levi-Civita connection of a Kähler–Einstein metric is Hermite-Einstein with respect to the Kähler-Einstein metric.

When the Hermitian vector bundle  has a holomorphic structure, there is a natural choice of Hermitian connection, the Chern connection. For the Chern connection, the condition that  is automatically satisfied. The Hitchin-Kobayashi correspondence asserts that a holomorphic vector bundle  admits a Hermitian metric  such that the associated Chern connection satisfies the Hermitian Yang-Mills equations if and only if the vector bundle is polystable. From this perspective, the Hermitian Yang-Mills equations can be seen as a system of equations for the metric  rather than the associated Chern connection, and such metrics solving the equations are called Hermite-Einstein metrics.

These equation imply the Yang-Mills equations in any dimension, and in real dimension four are closely related to the self-dual Yang-Mills equations that define instantons. The complex structure interacts with this as follows:

When the degree of the vector bundle  vanishes, then the Hermitian Yang-Mills equations become . By the above representation, this is precisely the condition that . That is,  is an ASD instanton. Notice that when the degree does not vanish, solutions of the Hermitian Yang-Mills equations cannot be anti-self-dual, and in fact there are no solutions to the ASD equations in this case.

See also
Einstein manifold
Deformed Hermitian Yang–Mills equation
Gauge theory (mathematics)

References

Vector bundles
Albert Einstein
Differential geometry
Partial differential equations